The 2006 National Cheerleading Championship is the first season of the National Cheerleading Championship, a cheerleading competition for college and high school teams in the Philippines. It was a one-time invitational and the inaugural cheerleading event held on April 2, 2006, at the Araneta Coliseum, Araneta Center, Quezon City.

Participating teams
10 teams took part in the first season: 5 College teams, and 5 High School teams.

College
 UP Pep Squad (University of the Philippines Diliman)
 CCP Bobcats (Central Colleges of the Philippines)
 Perpetual Help College
 Adamson Falcons (Adamson University)
 Mapúa Cardinals (Mapúa Institute of Technology)

High School
 Poveda Hardcourt (St. Pedro Poveda College)
 SHS Pep Squad (School of the Holy Spirit)
 SSA Seagulls Pep Squad (School of Saint Anthony)
 San Beda College Alabang
 Southville International School

Competition
Team placing

The cheerleading competition is divided into two divisions: the college division, and the High School division.

College

High school

References

National Cheerleading Championship
Sports in the Philippines
2006 in Philippine sport